Vansjø is a lake in the municipalities of Moss, Råde, Rygge, Våler in Østfold county, Norway.

Vansjø is part of Moss watershed (Mossevassdraget) stretching from Østmarka. Vansjø has four inflow rivers. The lake is fed by the Hobølelva which drains lake Sværsvann,  Veidalselva which originates  in Hobøl as well as Svinndalselva and    Mørkelva  which originate in Våler.

The lake has an area of 36.9 km2 and an estimated coastline of about 250 km. Vansjø supplies drinking water in many parts of Moss region.

Etymology
Etymologically the name likely derives from "Varna sjor", the ancient name of the municipality of Rygge.

See also
List of lakes in Norway

References

Våler, Østfold
Rygge
Råde
Moss, Norway
Lakes of Viken (county)